In mathematical abstract harmonic analysis, Harish-Chandra's Schwartz space is a space of functions on a semisimple Lie group whose derivatives are rapidly decreasing, studied by . It is an analogue of the Schwartz space on a real vector space, and is used to define the space of tempered distributions on a semisimple Lie group.

Definition

The definition of the Schwartz space uses Harish-Chandra's Ξ function and his σ function. The σ function is defined by

for x=k exp X with k in K and X in p for a Cartan decomposition G = K exp p of the Lie group G, where ||X|| is a K-invariant Euclidean norm on p, usually chosen to be  the Killing form. .

The Schwartz space on G consists roughly of the functions all of whose derivatives are rapidly decreasing compared to Ξ. More precisely, if G is connected then the Schwartz space consists of all smooth functions f on G such that 

is bounded, where D is a product of left-invariant and right-invariant differential operators on G .

References

Harmonic analysis
Representation theory